Berville-en-Roumois (literally Berville in Roumois) is a former commune in the Eure department in Normandy in northern France. On 1 January 2017, it was merged into the new commune Les Monts du Roumois.

Population

See also
Communes of the Eure department

References

Former communes of Eure